The 2014–15 Belgian Cup is the 60th season of Belgian's annual football cup competition. The competition began on 26 July 2014 and ended with the final on 22 March 2015. The winners of the competition will qualify for the 2015–16 UEFA Europa League play-off round. Lokeren are the defending champions.

Competition format
The competition consists of ten rounds. The first seven rounds are held as single-match elimination rounds. When tied after 90 minutes in the first three rounds, penalties are taken immediately. In rounds four to seven, when tied after 90 minutes first an extra time period of 30 minutes are played, then penalties are taken if still necessary. The quarter- and semifinals will be played over two legs, where the team winning on aggregate advances. The final will be played as a single match.

Teams enter the competition in different rounds, based upon their 2014–15 league affiliation. Teams from the fourth-level Promotion or lower began in Round 1. Third Division teams entered in Round 3, with Second Division teams joining in the following round. Teams from the Belgian First Division enter in Round 6.

First round
These round of matches were played on 26 & 27 July 2014.

Second round
These round of matches were played on 2 & 3 August 2014.

Third round
These round of matches were played on 9,10,13 & 14 August 2014.

Fourth round
These round of matches were played on 16 & 17 August 2014.

Fifth round
These round of matches were played on 23,24 & 26 August 2014.

Sixth round
These round of matches were played on 24 September 2014.

Seventh round
The matches took place on 2 and 3 December 2014.

Quarter-finals
The matches took place with the first legs on 17 December 2014 and the second legs on 21 January 2015.

First legs

Second legs

Semi-finals

First legs
The matches will take place with the first legs on 3 and 4 February 2015 and the second legs on 11 February 2015.

Second legs

Final

The final took place on 22 March 2015 at the King Baudouin Stadium in Brussels.

References

Belgian Cup seasons
Belgian Cup
Cup